Little Wars was a miniature wargaming magazine produced by TSR from 1976 to 1978.

History
TSR cancelled The Strategic Review after only seven issues in 1976, and replaced it with two magazines, Little Wars, which covered miniature wargaming, and The Dragon, which covered role playing games.  After twelve issues, Little Wars ceased independent publication and issue 13 was published as part of The Dragon issue 22.

References

Defunct magazines published in the United Kingdom
Magazines disestablished in 1978
Magazines established in 1976
TSR, Inc. magazines
Wargaming magazines